Casino Classics is a multi-CD remix compilation album by Saint Etienne. The first CD collects many of the remixes featured as B-sides on the band's singles from 1990 to 1995. The second contains rarer remixes (such as Underworld's remix of "Cool Kids of Death") and newly commissioned remixes. Disc one was originally a bonus CD released with limited copies of Too Young to Die - The Singles. Disc two features four previously unavailable songs. Early copies came in a card slipcase with a round sticker. An expanded, four-disc version of the compilation was released in 2012 with a revised running order. The band also released a fifth disc as a download-only extra.

The release is notable for collecting remixes in a variety of styles by many major artists, some of whom were then at early stages in their careers, including The Chemical Brothers, Aphex Twin, Andrew Weatherall, David Holmes (with Jagz Kooner) and Death in Vegas.

Some of the tracks on Casino Classics are remixes of songs that had not actually been released in their original form. "The Sea" (here called "Down by the Sea") and "Sometimes in Winter"  would later be released in their original forms on the Japan-only album Continental the following year. "Angel" and "Burnt Out Car" did not appear in their original versions until the fan club compilation Nice Price, released in 2006.

Promotional CDs preceded the album's release. "Angel" (Way Out West mix) and "Burnt Out Car" (Balearico mix), were released as a double A-side. "Burnt Out Car" was later included on greatest hits releases, including Smash the System: Singles 1990–99.

Track listings

CD: Heavenly / HVN LP 16 CD 

The CD sleeve does not list the titles of the mixes as given on their original release but instead simply credits each to the remixer. The original titles are listed here.

LP: Heavenly / HVN LP 16

CD: Heavenly / HVNLP 16CDRP1 

 UK promo to promote Casino Classics. The disc was only available from the band's fan club.

CD: Heavenly / HVNLP16CDDEX 
Released in 2012 in 2xCD and 4xCD versions. 
On both versions, "Cool Kids of Death (Underworld Mix)" and "Hug My Soul (Sure Is Pure Mix)" were edited in order to fit on a regular CD.

Charts

References

Saint Etienne (band) albums
1996 remix albums
Heavenly Recordings remix albums
House music remix albums